John MacLaughlin may refer to:
 John MacLaughlin (fencer)
 John MacLaughlin (priest)

See also
 John McLaughlin (disambiguation)
 John MacLoughlin, Irish politician
 John McLoughlin (disambiguation)